László Várkonyi (1909 – 1972) was a Hungarian international table tennis player.

Table tennis career
He won three medals at the World Table Tennis Championships from 1949 to 1952.

The three World Championship medals included two gold medal in the team event.

He was nicknamed Laci.

See also
 List of table tennis players
 List of World Table Tennis Championships medalists

References

Hungarian male table tennis players
1909 births
1972 deaths
Year of death missing
World Table Tennis Championships medalists
20th-century Hungarian people